The 2018–19 Sheffield Shield season was the 117th season of the Sheffield Shield, the domestic first-class cricket competition in Australia. The season started on 16 October 2018. For the first time in six seasons, the competition featured no day/night matches. The first five rounds took place prior to the international Test series against India, and in addition the season breaks for the Big Bash League.

Queensland were the defending champions. The final will include the use of the bonus point system that is used during the rest of the competition, in the event that the match ends in a draw.

New South Wales faced Victoria in the Sheffield Shield final at Junction Oval in Melbourne. Victoria beat New South Wales by 177 runs to win their 32nd title.

Points table

Round-Robin stage

Round 1

Round 2

Round 3

Round 4

Round 5

Round 6

Round 7

Round 8

Round 9

Round 10

Final

Statistics

Most runs

Most wickets

Broadcasting
All Sheffield Shield regular season matches were exclusively streamed live and free on Cricket Australia's official website, with the final broadcast live on Fox Sports' new Fox Cricket channel.

References

External links
 Series home at ESPN Cricinfo

Sheffield Shield
Sheffield Shield
Sheffield Shield seasons